Oxotremorine is a drug that acts as a selective muscarinic acetylcholine receptor agonist.

Oxotremorine produces ataxia, tremor and spasticity, similar to those symptoms seen in Parkinsonism, and has thus become a research tool in experimental studies aimed at determining more effective anti-Parkinsonian drugs.

Oxotremorine also produces antipsychotic effects.

References

See also 
 Tremorine

Alkyne derivatives
Pyrrolidones
Experimental drugs